The Wonderful Adventure (German: Das schöne Abenteuer) is a 1924 German silent film directed by Manfred Noa and starring Vilma Bánky, Georg Alexander and Ernst Reicher.

The film's sets were designed by the art director Oscar Werndorff.

Cast
 Vilma Bánky as Bessy Ferguson  
 Georg Alexander 
 Ernst Reicher as Micky  
 Hans Unterkircher as Seine Hoheit, der Prinz  
 Wolfgang von Schwindt
 Hans Albers as Henry Valescu  
 Anna Führing 
 Eugen Burg as Kiminalinspektor  
 Loni Pyrmont

References

Bibliography
 Schildgen, Rachel A. More Than A Dream: Rediscovering the Life and Films of Vilma Banky. 1921 PVG Publishing, 2010.

External links

1924 films
Films of the Weimar Republic
Films directed by Manfred Noa
German silent feature films
UFA GmbH films
German black-and-white films